The Villanova Wildcats men's lacrosse team represents Villanova University in National Collegiate Athletic Association (NCAA) Division I men's lacrosse. The Wildcats were elevated to the varsity level in 1981 after competing as a club sport since 1961.

History
Villanova currently competes as a member of the Big East Conference and plays their home games at Villanova Stadium in Villanova, Pennsylvania.

Villanova competed as an independent until joining the Colonial Athletic Association in 2002; winning the CAA tournament for their first title in 2009. The fourth-seeded Wildcats were the lowest-seeded champions in conference tournament history but had qualified for conference tournament for the fifth year in a row. Villanova also made their first NCAA tournament appearance in 2009 but lost in the first round to the top-seeded Virginia, 18–6.

Season Results
The following is a list of Villanova's results by season as an NCAA Division I program:

{| class="wikitable"

|- align="center"

†NCAA canceled 2020 collegiate activities due to the COVID-19 virus.

See also
Lacrosse in Pennsylvania

References

External links
 

NCAA Division I men's lacrosse teams
Villanova Wildcats men's lacrosse
1961 establishments in Pennsylvania
Lacrosse clubs established in 1961